Gyebaek, or Kyebaek (died 20 August 660), was a general in the ancient Korean kingdom of Baekje during the early to mid-7th century. Little else is known of his personal life—including the year and location of his birth.

The Last Battle

In 660, Baekje was invaded by a force of 50,000 from Silla, supported by 144,000 Tang soldiers. Gyebaek, with only 5,000 troops under his command, met them in the battlefield of Hwangsanbeol. Before entering the battlefield, Gyebaek reportedly killed his wife and children to prevent them from being enslaved if he lost.

His forces won four initial battles, causing severe casualties to Silla forces. General Gyebaek fought very courageously and killed many Silla soldiers. However, in the end, exhausted and surrounded, Gyebaek's army was outnumbered and overwhelmed. Baekje's forces were annihilated in battle along with their leader Gyebaek.

Aftermath
Baekje was destroyed, shortly after Gyebaek's defeat and death at Hwangsanbeol.

As Neo-Confucian philosophy became more influential in the later Korean Dynasties, Gyebaek was recognized by historians and scholars as exemplifying the Confucian ideals of patriotism and devotion to his king, Uija, and praised as such. Although not much else is known about Gyebaek's life, his actions leading up to his last battle are well known to many Koreans.

In Taekwon-Do
Gaebaek is the 12th pattern or hyeong in the International Taekwon-Do Federation form of the Korean martial art taekwondo. It is part of the criteria for the 1st Dan black belt. The diagram (I) represents his severe and strict military discipline.

In popular culture
 Portrayed by Park Joong-hoon in the 2003 film Once Upon a Time in a Battlefield 
 Portrayed by Jung Heung-chae in 2006–2007 SBS TV series Yeon Gaesomun
 Portrayed by Choi Won-young in the 2009 MBC TV series Queen Seondeok
 Portrayed by Lee Seo-jin and Lee Hyun-woo in the 2011 MBC TV series Gyebaek
 Portrayed by Choi Jae-sung in the 2012–2013 KBS1 TV series Dream of the Emperor
 Featured in Age of Empires II HD Edition
 Portrayed in the 2021 webnovel titled Queen Jindeok by author Taiyang Dasheng

See also
History of Korea
Three Kingdoms of Korea
Gyebaek (TV series)

References

External links
 Nonsan govt text about the battle
Gyebaek statue
Another Gyebaek statue
Gyebaek on Encykorea .

Baekje people
Korean generals
660 deaths
Year of birth unknown
6th-century Korean people
7th-century Korean people